"Keep It Right There" is a song by American R&B duo Changing Faces recorded for their self-titled debut album Changing Faces (1994). The song was released as the third and final single for the album on March 14, 1995.

Track listings
12", Vinyl
"Keep It Right There" (Original Mix) - 3:55
"Keep It Right There" (DeVante Swing Remix) - 3:25
"Keep It Right There" (Acapella) - 3:55
"Keep It Right There" (Salaam Remix) - 3:55
"Keep It Right There" (Salaam Remix Instrumental) - 4:01
"Keep It Right There" (DeVante Swing Remix Instrumental) - 3:24

Personnel
Information taken from Discogs.
assistant mix engineer: John Schriver
assistant recording engineer: Gus Garcas
executive production: Charnise Carter, Craig Kallman, Kenny "Smoove" Kornegay
mix engineer: Tony Maserati
mixing: Charles Alexander, Eddison Electrik, Gary Noble
multi-instruments: DeVante Swing
production: DeVante Swing
recording engineers: Brian Hall, Mario Rodriguez
remixing: Nicholas Brancker, DeVante Swing, Eddison Electrik, Salaam Remi
writing: DeVante Swing

Chart performance

Notes

1995 singles
Changing Faces (group) songs
Song recordings produced by DeVante Swing
Songs written by DeVante Swing